The Hinlopen Strait is the strait between Spitsbergen and Nordaustlandet in Svalbard, Norway. The strait is difficult to pass because of pack ice. It is believed to have been named after Thijmen Jacobsz Hinlopen.

The northern part of the strait is called Nordporten, between Storsteinhalvøya and Mosselhalvøya. The southern part, called Sørporten, widens up between Bråsvellbreen and the Bastian Islands.

References

External links 
 http://www.caplex.no/Web/ArticleView.aspx?id=9314679 (Norwegian)
 Hinlopen Strait's wildlife
 Hinlopen Strait's geology and landscape
 Hinlopen Strait's history
 Hinlopen Strait's vegetation

Straits of Svalbard